K2-21c also known as EPIC 206011691 c is an exoplanet orbiting K2-21 a red dwarf, every 15.5 days 273.5 ly away.

References

Exoplanets discovered in 2015
Transiting exoplanets
2
Aquarius (constellation)